Newcourt railway station may refer to:

 Newcourt railway station (England), a station in Exeter, Devon
 Newcourt railway station (Ireland), a disused station in County Cork